"Gladly" is a song by British musician Tirzah. It was produced by Micachu aka Mica Levi. The single was released on 3 March 2018.

Reception
The track has been met with positive reviews by music critics such as Pitchfork and The Guardian.

Music video
The music video for "Gladly" was released on 3 May 2018. It was directed by Hannah Perry.

Track listing

References

External links
 Tirzah - Gladly (Music Video on YouTube)

2018 singles
2018 songs
Tirzah_(musician)_songs